Conopophaga is a genus of birds in the gnateater family. Its members are found in forest and woodland in South America.

Taxonomy and species list 
The genus Conopophaga was introduced in 1816 by the French ornithologist Louis Jean Pierre Vieillot. The name combines the Ancient Greek kōnōps meaning "gnat" with -phagos meaning "-eating". The type species was subsequently designated as the chestnut-belted gnateater by George Robert Gray in 1840. The genus now contains ten species, all with "gnateater" in their common names.

Distribution and habitat
Gnateaters are birds found in the undergrowth of forest, woodland, and bamboo stands, with most species in the Amazon Basin, the Atlantic Forest, and the East Andean slopes. All are associated with dense thickets. While they are always found near the ground, seldom rising more than 1.5 m up, they also seldom travel or spend much time on the ground itself (though they do feed there; see diet).

They are quite upright when standing. They are sexually dimorphic, with various shades of brown, rufous, olive, white, grey and black being the dominating colours. Most Conopophaga species have a white tuft behind the eye.

Food and feeding
Gnateaters are insectivorous as the group name implies. They feed mostly using two methods; one is to perch above the forest floor until prey is spotted, then lunge down to the ground to snatch it; having landed on the ground to snatch a prey item, it will not remain on the forest floor for more than a couple of seconds. The second method used by gnateaters is to glean insects directly from the foliage, trunks, and branches of low vegetation. Typical prey items include spiders, caterpillars, insect larvae, grasshoppers and beetles; individuals of some species have also been observed eating fruit, and in one case a frog.

References

Rice, Nathan H. (2005b): Further Evidence for Paraphyly of the Formicariidae (Passeriformes). Condor 107(4): 910–915. [English with Spanish abstract]  PDF fulltext

 
Bird genera
Taxa named by Louis Jean Pierre Vieillot